Kembach (in its upper course: Welzbach) is a river of Bavaria and Baden-Württemberg, Germany. It flows into the Main near Wertheim am Main.

See also
List of rivers of Baden-Württemberg

References

Rivers of Baden-Württemberg
Rivers of Bavaria
Rivers of Germany